Nguyễn Thị Tâm (born 4 April 1994) is a Vietnamese boxer. She competed in the women's flyweight event at the 2020 Summer Olympics.

References

External links
 

1994 births
Living people
People from Thái Bình province
Vietnamese women boxers
Olympic boxers of Vietnam
Boxers at the 2020 Summer Olympics
Boxers at the 2018 Asian Games
Medalists at the 2018 Asian Games
Asian Games medalists in boxing
Asian Games bronze medalists for Vietnam
21st-century Vietnamese women